Stanley Winckworth Scott (24 March 1854 – 8 December 1933) was an English cricketer who played for Middlesex.

Scott was a middle-order batsman who played fairly regularly for Middlesex from 1878 to 1893, heading the batting averages in several seasons, though by modern standards his figures appear modest. His best season was 1892, when he scored 1015 runs at an average of 39 runs per innings, and against Gloucestershire at Lord's that season he scored 224, then regarded as a colossal score. He did well that season in both Gentlemen v Players matches at Lord's and The Oval, and was named as a Wisden Cricketer of the Year in 1893.

But at the end of the 1893 season he retired to become a stockbroker.

He also played football and played for Clapham Rovers in the 1879 FA Cup Final, losing 1–0 to  the Old Etonians.

Honours
Clapham Rovers
FA Cup finalist: 1879

External links
 Cricinfo
 Cricket Archive

1854 births
1933 deaths
English cricketers
Middlesex cricketers
Wisden Cricketers of the Year
English footballers
Clapham Rovers F.C. players
English stockbrokers
Gentlemen of the South cricketers
Gentlemen cricketers
Marylebone Cricket Club cricketers
Gentlemen of England cricketers
Association footballers not categorized by position
FA Cup Final players